Walter Franklin Horan (October 15, 1898 – December 19, 1966) was an American politician, a congressman from eastern Washington for 22 years. First elected in 1942, he was a Republican member of the United States House of Representatives for eleven terms, from January 3, 1943, to January 3, 1965. Horan represented the Fifth Congressional District of Washington, which included Spokane and Wenatchee.

Early life
A fruit grower and packer, Horan was born and raised near Wenatchee, the younger son of Michael and Margaret A. (Rankin) Horan. His father Mike (1854–1919) was a pioneer fruit grower in the valley and the son of Irish immigrants. Walt served in the U.S. Navy as a gunner's mate during World War I, and earned a bachelor's degree from Washington State College in Pullman in 1925.
His wife, Helen L. "Sally" Campbell of Eureka, Montana, was a college classmate. Horan and his older brother John (1896–1954) operated one of the largest fruit ranches in the state. He ran for Congress in 1942, primarily to improve the representation of the agricultural sector.

Congressional career 
Horan ran for Congress in 1940 from the 5th congressional district, but lost the general election to the two-term incumbent, Democrat Charles H. Leavy. Leavy resigned in August 1942 to become a federal judge on the U.S. District Court in western Washington, which left the seat vacant. In the Republican primary in September, Horan defeated Spokane attorney and civic leader Joe Albi, then easily defeated former two-term U.S. Senator and 1940 gubernatorial candidate Clarence Dill in the general election in November. Horan's victory was the first win by a Republican in the district in twenty years.

In Congress, he acted as chairman of the House District of Columbia Committee, and sat on the Agriculture, Legislative, State, Commerce, Justice, and Judiciary Sub-Committees of the House Appropriations Committee. Horan voted in favor of the Civil Rights Acts of 1957, 1960, and 1964, as well as the 24th Amendment to the U.S. Constitution.

Defeat
Seeking a twelfth term at age 66, Horan won the Republican primary over Sam C. Parks, but was defeated in the 1964 general election by Democrat Tom Foley, a 35-year-old Spokane lawyer. Foley held the seat for the next thirty years, including the last six as Speaker of the House, until defeated in 1994 at age 65 by George Nethercutt.

Horan suffered acute pulmonary edema on election night in Wenatchee and was hospitalized for several weeks. Ten months earlier in January, he had been treated at Bethesda Naval Hospital for a pleurisy attack, which was publicly known.

Death
Two years out of office, Horan and his wife Sally (1904–95) were in the Philippines in December 1966 to visit
their daughter and her family. He suffered a fatal heart attack in Manila at age 68. Horan and his wife are buried in the Wenatchee City Cemetery.

The plaza at the federal courthouse in Spokane is named for Horan. The brothers' fruit operation continues as McDougall & Sons. Following John's stroke (and death in 1954), Jacquelyn (1924–2008), eldest of his four daughters, and her husband Robert D. McDougall (1924–2012) took over management of Horan Brothers after Walt Horan's son Michael ran the orchard until it was taken by the government and turned into a park.  All of the fruit trees were cut down.

References

External links 
 
 Washington Secretary of State – History Makers – Walt Horan
 

1898 births
1966 deaths
United States Navy personnel of World War I
Washington State University alumni
American orchardists
American people of Irish descent
Republican Party members of the United States House of Representatives from Washington (state)
20th-century American politicians
United States Navy sailors